OCCRA stands for Oakland County Competitive Robotics Association.  OCCRA is an organized competition between the robotics teams of about 30 different high schools in Oakland County, Michigan, United States, that takes place each fall, beginning in early September and ending in early December.

OCCRA vs. FIRST Robotics
Although inspired by FIRST Robotics, OCCRA differs from FIRST in several key ways.  Firstly, the student members of the robotics teams are expected to design and build the robots without direct assistance from their adult mentors. This gives students more responsibility and allows them to develop leadership skills.

In OCCRA, teams are also forbidden from having corporate sponsorships.  Each team is responsible for raising its own money to promote teamwork and to teach students to work within a budget. The league as a whole has corporate sponsors.

Furthermore, "heavy machinery" is restricted.  Lathes and other types of precision machinery are not to be used in the construction of OCCRA-bound robots.  Instead, students build their robots with rulers, hacksaws, and cordless drills.  This rule is intended to ensure equality among teams with varying resources (e.g. having a machine shop in the team's high school or in a team member's garage).

One key way in which OCCRA does emulate FIRST is that OCCRA maintains a policy of gracious professionalism.

See also
FIRST

External links
Official OCCRA website
ChiefDelphi Forums - OCCRA
AdamBots (Team 245) - OCCRA
Monsters308
PDF file released by Oakland Schools.

OCCRA